Niteflyte was an American funk group, whose main members were Howard Johnson and Sandy Torano. They released an album on Ariola Records in 1979, which peaked at #59 on the Billboard Soul Albums chart, and a single, "If You Want It", which hit #37 on the U.S. Billboard Hot 100 chart.

A second album followed in 1981 on Ariola, but failed to attain the success they had. After the album's release, the band split and Johnson embarked on a solo career.

Discography

Albums

Singles

References

External links
 Discogs

American dance music groups
American disco groups